CHNB-TV was a television station in North Bay, Ontario, Canada. The station was in operation from 1971 to 2002 as a private affiliate of CBC Television.

History
CHNB was established on October 15, 1971 by J. Conrad Lavigne, the owner of CFCL in Timmins. On the same day, the existing television station in North Bay, CKNY, switched affiliation to CTV.

Until 1980, CHNB and CKNY aggressively competed with each other for advertising revenues, leaving both in a precarious financial position due to the North Bay market's relatively small size. In 1980, the Canadian Radio-television and Telecommunications Commission approved the merger of the two stations, and with their co-owned stations in Sudbury and Timmins, into the MCTV twinstick.

In 1990, the MCTV stations were acquired by Baton Broadcasting, which became the sole corporate owner of CTV in 1997.

End of operations
In 2002, CTV sold its four CBC affiliates in Northern Ontario, CHNB, CJIC in Sault Ste. Marie, CKNC in Sudbury and CFCL in Timmins directly to the CBC. All four ceased to exist as separate stations on October 27, 2002, and become rebroadcasters of Toronto's CBLT. CHNB's call sign was changed to CBLT-4. These translators closed on July 31, 2012, because of budget cuts at the CBC.

Since 2013, the CHNB callsign currently belongs to a television station in Saint John, New Brunswick, known as CHNB-DT.

References

External links
CRTC Decision 2001-457-6, licence renewal for all MCTV stations.
 

HNB
HNB
Television channels and stations established in 1971
Television channels and stations disestablished in 2002
1971 establishments in Ontario
2002 disestablishments in Ontario
HNB-TV